A voter is someone who votes in an election.

Voter may also refer to:

Voter (film), a 2019 Indian Telugu film
Voter (horse), a Thoroughbred racehorse bred in England that raced in the United States
The Voter (short story), by Chinua Achebe
The Voter (film), an upcoming Indian Malayalam film